The 1941 Auckland Rugby League season was its 33rd. 

North Shore Albions won the Fox Memorial Shield for the 6th time since their formation in 1909. Their previous titles were in 1913, 1914, 1928, 1932, and 1933. This was to be their last first grade championship title. They finished with a 13 win, 1 draw, 2 loss record for 27 competition points, just one competition point ahead of Manukau. Both teams were well out in front in the title race with Richmond Rovers in 3rd, 8 points behind Manukau.

Manukau did however win the Roope Rooster knockout final when they defeated Ponsonby United 28–10 in the final. This was their second Roope Rooster win, following their 1936 win over City. Mount Albert United won the Phelan Shield for the first time when they beat Richmond 8–7 in the final. The Phelan Shield was competed for between teams who had been knocked out of the Roope Rooster in the early rounds. In the Stormont Shield, champion of champions match between North Shore (first grade winners), and Manukau (Roope Rooster winners) the Onehunga based Manukau side won easily 30–10. This was also the first time Manukau had won the Stormont Shield.

George Mitchell of the Richmond club won the J.F.W. Dickson medal for the most sportsmanlike player, while R. Martin, an Otahuhu 5th grade player won the same award for junior players.

The season was extremely disrupted by World War 2 with a huge number of senior grade players in first grade, reserve grade, and the senior B grade going away to fight. As a result, the reserve grade and senior B grade were merged and City Rovers, Newton Rangers, and Papakura unable to field any teams in the grade. Otahuhu Rovers won the senior B grade for the 4th consecutive time, although it was essentially a combined grade with the reserve competition. As a result, they gained admission to the Roope Rooster competition where they beat Papakura in the first round before losing by a point to City Rovers in round 2.

With the war on the representative season was once again relatively short with matches only played within a small geographical area. Auckland Māori played against South Auckland (Waikato) and an Auckland Pākehā side. Auckland played twice against South Auckland, winning both matches. Also a senior B trial match was played between senior and junior affiliated clubs on September 13 and the recently formed New Zealand Old Boys Association played a match against the South Auckland Old Boys at Western Springs in late September.

Auckland Rugby League News

Season prospects
The Auckland Rugby League held a special meeting on March 13. It was indicated that the competitions would carry on as usual and be successful “in spite of many players being in the fighting forces”. The chairman, Mr. G. Grey Campbell said that “last season was easily the best experienced for many years, as the annual report would show, and already several clubs were mustering their forces in anticipation of another good year… it is pleasing to know that progress during the past three years has been marked, and every thanks is due to the excellent co-operation of the players and all officials, even down to the ball boys. The enthusiasm shown in club competition was remarkable and the public gave most generous support”. They then decided to hold their annual meeting on April 2.

Annual meeting
Their 31st Annual Meeting was held at the League Rooms in the Grey Buildings, Courthouse Lane on Wednesday, April 2 at 7.45pm. Remarkably despite the disruption caused by the war the 1940 season had turned out to be a record year for revenue for Auckland Rugby League. Revenue from gates and the grandstand were £4370 which was the highest ever. This allowed £1885 to be transferred to the appropriation account, compared with £1537 in 1939. “Liberal expenditure was allowed for maintenance, £218 was paid to injured players, and grants amounting to £705 were made to clubs”. A benefit match for the injured players’ fund realised £169. The league also raised £398 for “patriotic purposes”, and £198 was granted to the Sports’ Queen fund. The “total assets of the league were £10,853, and a reserve had been created for expenses of a capital nature likely to occur during the coming season”. It was stated that 800 players competed in the junior grades and there were 38 teams in the schoolboy competition. The ladies committee was also referred to in the annual report. They held many functions and from these donated £161 to patriotic funds, and £64 to the injured players fund and “also assisted several patriotic organisations”. At the meeting president John A. Lee spoke, saying “in spite of the war conditions, so satisfactory a balance-sheet speaks volumes for the excellent spirit which prevailed last year… the league code has gone from success to success, and in the forces fighting in the Middle East, league players are doing well in the rugby union fifteens”. Chairman C. Grey Campbell said “in days of stress ahead the management would rally round any deserving war cause… [and] the future was very uncertain from a playing point of view, but the speaker had no hesitation in saying that the right thing was to carry on doing a part in New Zealand affairs as a sports organisation. It was far better that the public should be occupied in their thoughts away from the tragic happenings in England. The game’s players, officials and supporters were behind the government and the people of Britain in their great struggle”. The following officers were elected at the meeting:- Patron, Mr. J.B. Donald; vice patron, Mr. J.F.W. Dickson; president, Mr. John A. Lee, M.P., vice presidents, the Mayor, Sir Ernest Davis, Messrs. J. Donald, C. H. Drysdale, H. Grange, R.J. Laird, W.J. Lovett, E. Morton, F. W. Schramm, M.P., W. Wallace, H.W. Brien, L. Coakley, H. Luke, R. D. Bagnall, E. Montgomery, T.G. Symonds, G.T. Wright, R.H. Wood, H. Walmesley, Joe Sayegh, R.H. Benson, A. Moody, H. W. Gray, J. C. Gleeson, B. Brigham, N. Kyle; trustees, Messrs. G. Grey Campbell, Edward John Phelan, A. Stormont; auditor, Mr. R.A. Spinley; hon. solicitor Mr. H.M. Rogerson; hon. physicians, Drs. M.G. Pezaro, S. Morris, K.H. Holdgate, J.N. Waddell, G.W. Lock, H. Burrell, H. Smith; board of control, Messrs. G. Grey Campbell (chairman), Edward John Phelan, William Mincham, V. Rose, R. Doble, T. Davis, J.W. Probert, T. Wilson, Jim Clark, J.F. Knowling (treasurer), Ivan Culpan (secretary); finance committee, Messrs. J.W. Probert, T. Wilson, William Mincham; delegate to New Zealand Rugby League, Mr. R. Doble. At the meeting a framed photograph of the board of control was presenting by Mr. J. A. Lee to chairman Mr. C. Grey Campbell.

Communication with English rugby league
It was decided at a meeting early in the season to send a message of support to the English rugby league which was endeavouring to carry on its operations in spite of the war. They had “expressed deep appreciation and admiration of the magnificent courage of the English people”. It was reported in the New Zealand Herald on April 12 that the English Rugby League replied: “our heartfelt thanks for your inspiring message. We are playing football: we are cheerful; we will ever be strong”.

Amalgamation and suspension of the reserve grade
At the annual meeting on April 2 the possibility of amalgamating some senior clubs was discussed with delegates being asked to keep an open mind on the idea. It was decided to suspend the senior reserve grade competition for the 1941 season. They also planned a series of preliminary games on Saturday, April 19 to see first hand the playing strength of the senior clubs, so they could then finalise the details regarding the senior grade competition. At the board of control meeting on April 23 Mr. J. Rutledge of the City Rovers club suggested that “the stronger clubs give their strength to the weaker clubs, and then you would have a better balanced competition”. The City, Newton and Papakura clubs had all been in conference with the league about their prospects for the season after having struggled somewhat in recent time. Chairman Campbell remarked that there might be some merit in the suggestion. Richmond Rovers was named by Rutledge as a club in particular that had a lot of strength.

Huntly teams desire to join the Auckland competition
At the board of control meeting on April 16 the Huntly club sent a deputation to ask about entering a team in the senior championship. Mr. W.C. Davies, the South Auckland Rugby League's chairman spoke on their behalf and said they “desired to play matches at Carlaw park and at Huntly on alternate Saturday’s and the clubs were not concerned with gate receipts” at Carlaw Park. Auckland Rugby League's deputy-chairman, Mr. E. J. Phelan said that the clubs had already discussed the issue and had raised many questions and difficulties. Mr. F. T. McAneny, chairman of the senior clubs’ officers’ association said “the general impression of his executive was that the scheme was a wartime measure, but, judging from the remarks of members of the deputation, their idea was a permanent one. Auckland clubs… had a strong objection to playing what appeared to be a fully representative South Auckland (northern Waikato) team,… and the question of transport was also a matter to consider”. Phelan said that in the absence of chairman Campbell no final decision could be made until after their meeting the following week. In mid May the South Auckland (northern Waikato) wrote to the ARL “expressing its intention of inviting Auckland senior clubs to play matches at Huntly”. The secretary, Ivan Culpan, was advised by the ARL board to advise all clubs of the offer for when they had their byes. Richmond and North Shore had already travelled to Davies Park in Huntly to play local sides.

Senior competitions
At the meeting on April 23 it was decided to make no alteration to the senior teams from the previous season and to decline the applications from Huntly and Otahuhu to enter sides. It was  “resolved that senior clubs with teams in the senior B competition be allowed to draw on senior B players, provided the players concerned do not participate in three consecutive games, or five at intervals, in the second round of the competition. Richmond reported that their senior team was unable to obtain a supply of the club coloured jerseys, and permission was given to them to wear white jerseys and pants, and maroon stockings in place of their usual maroon and blue.

Protest by Otahuhu
In early May the Otahuhu club wrote a letter of protest to the Auckland Rugby League regarding their non-acceptance of their senior team. They “made suggestions that a fairer method of selection be devised in future. The letter pointed out that the Otahuhu club was in a position to field a strong team at the start of the season, but since then senior clubs in the city had made Otahuhu a recruiting ground”.

Junior competitions
There were fifty three team nominations for junior sides received by the Auckland Rugby League when nominations closed in late April. It was then decided to commence the season on May 10.

Carlaw Park and other grounds
On the afternoon of January 16 a grass fire on the railway embankment threatened the railway grandstand before it was extinguished by fire fighters from the central fire station. Only slight damage was caused to the advertising hoardings behind the stand. Carlaw Park was being used regularly for military activities after the Auckland Rugby League having granted its use to the army in 1940 with the first Battalion, Auckland Regiment parading there in January. Indeed, the ground during the summer of 1940-41 saw the ground and facilities being loaned out to “various bodies and letters of thanks were read [at a meeting on March 13] from the military authorities, the New Zealand Red Cross Society, the Patrotic Sports committee, and Home Guard units”. At the annual meeting on April 2 chairman Campbell announced that the lease for Carlaw Park had been extended by 21 years. It was also reported at the meeting that Carlaw Park would not be available for night training “owing to the blackout regulations” but “other arrangements, however, were being made”. Chairman Campbell said that training could take place “between the hours of 5 p.m. and 7.30 p.m.” and a suggestion was made that a “well-known gymnasium might be taken over for physical training”. Whilst many teams had their own grounds in the outer suburbs and could train at them, City Rovers, Ponsonby United, Marist Old Boys, and Newton Rangers all relied on Carlaw Park for the majority of their training. On April 5 they were all scheduled to train on the same day with Newton allocated the No. 1 ground from 2 pm to 3:30 pm, Ponsonby No. 1 from 3:30 to 5 pm, Marist No. 2 from 2pm to 3:30 pm, and City No. 2 from 3:30 to 5pm. As in previous times, soldiers, sailors, and airmen were admitted to the ground free of charge along with children. On match days special trams ran from Customs Street to Carlaw Park. In May the Auckland Council advised that the following grounds had been allocated for rugby league for the season: Auckland Domain (2), Outer Domain (1), Victoria Park (1), Walker Park (2), Western Springs (1), Grey Lynn (1).

In June the Mount Albert club requested that the league consider improving the lighting in the dressing rooms at Carlaw Park and the league agreed to the request.

In September Opai Asher, the custodian of Carlaw Park had his handcart stolen and smashed up. After not being able to find it in the morning he searched up into the Auckland Domain and "spied what looked like a heap of wood. It was the remains of the handcart, upside down, absolutely dismantled, with the wheels, springs and axle missing". The police were left to look into the matter.

At the June 25 ARL meeting the Newton club “drew attention to the lack of protection afforded players through goal posts on suburban grounds not being properly padded. Many injuries had been reported during the last few Saturdays as the result of crashing against the posts”. The league decided to take the issue up with the local bodies involved. It was reported that the Auckland City Council's parks and reserve committee that “provided the necessary equipment was available, the groundsmen would attend to the requirements”.

Tenders for refreshment rights and programme rights
On April 5 the Auckland Rugby League put out a tender advertisement in the Auckland newspapers. It asked for tenders for “Refreshment Rights” for Carlaw Park, and “Programme Rights” for the 1941 season with it stated that the highest or any tender not necessarily accepted”.

Auckland representative team
In April Hec Brisbane notified the league that due to “private reasons” he would not be able to offer his services as a selector this year. The ARL then appointed Bill Cloke, Dougie McGregor, and Stan Prentice as selectors for the season.

Old Boys club rooms
On June 14 the Rugby League Old Boys’ Association opened its “newly established” club rooms on Great North Road in the evening with nearly 200 in attendance. The opening ceremony was performed by Mr. John A. Redwood, the president of New Zealand Rugby League. The club rooms were large and contained 2 full sized billiard tables, 2 indoor bowling greens, reading rooms, and with photographs around the walls of “historic events since the inception of league football in Auckland”. Those who spoke at the opening included ARL chairman C Grey Campbell, president John A. Lee, and Steve Watene who was chairman of the Māori Control Board. The secretary of the club was Mr. William Opie and he said that one of the objectives of the club was to give assistance to “old players of the league game who were financially embarrassed”. During the evening “use was made of the recreation facilities of the club, Clark McConachy, New Zealand billiards champion figuring in an exhibition of billiards and snooker in association with E.V. Roberts, a former New Zealand champion and Craddock Dufty, of full back fame, respectively”. Toasts were offered for “the King”, “Absent Friends”, “Parent Bodies”, and “Visitors Club Rooms Opened/League Old Boys.

Ladies Committee
On July 2 the Auckland Rugby League Ladies Social Committee held a dance at the Peter Pan Cabaret. The evening featured “modern and old-time dancing” from 8 to 12pm. It “attracted a crowded attendance” with guests including Ivan Culpan, the secretary of Auckland Rugby League and chairman Campbell. The proceeds from the dance were to be “divided between the injured players’ fund and the sick benefit of the ladies’ committee. The committee was:- Mrs. I Stonex, Mrs. C. Howe, Mrs. Chernside, Mrs. R. Doble and Mrs. A Scott (secretary). On August 20 the board thanked the ladies committee for a donation of £25 for the injured players fund.

Players in military service and military related news
It was reported on June 21 that three former senior players were reported safe and back in the Middle East after “participating in the Greece and Crete campaigns. They were Laurie Mills, Trevor Bramley, and J. Vernall who had all played for the Richmond senior side, with Mills and Bramley meeting up on the same transport in a “hurried evacuation”. Bramley had played in several army games in Cairo and had won the General Freyberg Medal for being part of a New Zealand unit which won a seven-a-side rugby tournament. Sadly Mills was later killed in battle. Jack Campbell who had played for Ponsonby senior side in 1938 before transferring to Christchurch was reported missing after serving in Greece and being evacuated to Crete. Around the same time Ivor Stirling was also reported missing in the Middle East. Both players were part of the same unit. Stirling had played for the North Shore Albions in 1937 and 38. He ultimately survived the war and his son Ken Stirling also represented New Zealand at rugby league while his daughter Glenda Stirling represented New Zealand at the 1968 Summer Olympics and 1970 British Commonwealth Games.

Prior to round 9 on July 5 both Verdun Scott of North Shore and Arthur McInnarney of Mount Albert departed to join up to camps at Trentham and Papakura respectively. It was reported on July 7 that Private H. A. Meyer of the Point Chevalier club was a prisoner of war. On July 12 it was reported that Lance-corporal H. R. McKinnon was missing. He had played “for the Richmond club for over ten years, from schooldays to his enlistment, when he was playing senior grade”. On July 26 it was reported that Martin Hansen, the captain of the Mount Albert team had returned from the war. He fought in Egypt and was evacuated from Greece. While overseas he saw other Auckland league players W. Walker (Mount Albert), Trevor Bramley and Laurie Mills (Richmond), Noel Martin and Dan Klane (Ponsonby). The latter two were now prisoners of war. Hansen had been wounded and spent time in a Scottish hospital before moving to another hospital and then returning to New Zealand.

With several players in the army in the Wellington area it was asked who the players would return to if they played league for various Wellington clubs while on service. “it was eventually decided, subject to approval of the New Zealand Rugby League, that any players on active service are free to play for any club without registration, but upon return to Auckland on military leave the player must revert back to his former club”.

In August the league donated £75 to the Fighters’ Mother Fund and the Auckland Trotting Club wrote a letter expressing their appreciation for the donation on behalf of the Allied Sports Gymkhana.

Representative fixtures
Auckland decided to play South Auckland on July 12 after a request from their southern neighbours. Mr. W. C. Davies, secretary of the South Auckland League also requested a higher percentage of the gate receipts as the gate percentages offered to his team had been gradually reduced over time. They felt that 40% was a reasonable request after amusement taxes were deducted especially after their “fine showing” in their last two matches. After a discussion in committee, chairman Campbell told the deputation that the request would be granted. Mr. T. Shaw of Huntly said that their fans in the Lower Waikato were looking forward to seeing an Auckland team in action.

Obituaries

Walter Roland Clarke
It was reported in May that former Papakura senior player, Gunner Walter Roland Clarke was killed in action on April 15 as part of an anti-tank unit. Clarke was the first Papakura player killed in action in the war. He had been educated at Papakura District School and as well as playing for the Papakura senior side in the forwards and was also a “keen supporter of the Papakura Greyhound Racing Club”. Before enlisting in the military he had been working as a grocer's assistant driving the mail and grocers van. Clarke enlisted in 1940 with the second Echelon and spent 7 months in England before moving to Egypt. He was aged just 24 at the time of his death.

John David Campbell Long
John David Campbell Long was killed on May 11, 1941, after having initially been reported missing in action. He was a player in the Avondale 3rd grade side. Long had joined the Royal New Zealand Air Force and trained at the Levin and Ohakea stations before leaving for the war on April 26, 1940. His last rank was Sergeant (Rear Gunner). He had been educated at Owairaka Primary School and Mount Albert Grammar School before becoming employed at the Otahuhu Railway Workshops. He was just 21 years of age when he was killed. His name is on the Otahuhu Railway Workshops War Memorial on the corner of Piki Thompson Way in Ōtāhuhu, Auckland.

George Gardiner
On May 17 George Gardiner was killed in action in Tobruk. Gardiner had played rugby league for New Zealand on 21 occasions and represented Marist Old Boys in 1924, and Ponsonby United from 1925 to 1932. He also played 4 matches for Auckland in 1924–25, and one for Auckland Province in 1925. After his rugby league career finished he moved to Australia and enlisted in the army there aged over 40 using a fake age as he was 'too old' to enlist, after having earlier fought in World War 1 also using a fake age as he had been too young at that time. He was part of the Australian 2/23rd Battalion and left for the Middle East in November 1940. In early 1941 a German advance in Libya pushed British and Commonwealth forces back towards the Egyptian border. In “the early hours of 17 May the 2/23rd Battalion participated in an unsuccessful attempt to recapture the lost ground”. They made some gains but most of the Australian attacking forces were forced back and they suffered heavy casualties. After the operation there were 95 Australians reported missing including Gardiner amongst six other officers. There were conflicting reports of what had happened to him including him being taken to a hospital in Egypt, or that he had been captured. It was later determined after an inquiry that he had been shot “through the abdomen and died of his wounds the day after the battle”. His death occurred in fighting at Cyrenaica near Tobruk with the cause of death recorded as peritonitis.
 
On May 13, 1942, the Bay of Plenty Times published an obituary for George Gardiner. On 10 April 2016 the Australian War Memorial held a ceremony to commemorate Lieutenant George Gardiner's life and service. Gardiner was survived by his wife Mary Gardiner and a son, Parata Ngatai Gardiner.

Walter Gamble Mulholland
On August 2, Walter Gamble Mulholland passed away aged 58. He was a former secretary of Newton Rangers and secretary of the Auckland Rugby League Referees’ Association in 1909–10.

Bernard George Evans
It was reported in mid August that North Shore senior player Bernard George Evans had been killed “in the course of air operations”. He had been born at Takapuna and educated at Takapuna Grammar School before playing rugby union for Takapuna Rugby Club. He moved to Sydney and joined the rugby league code and then returned to New Zealand. He then joined the North Shore Albions. He was also a cyclist competing in Takapuna events and a member of the Takapuna junior surf club. He had volunteered into the Air Force early in 1940 and after spending six months preliminary training at Levin and Ohakea he left for Scotland to complete his training as an air gunner. Details of his death later revealed that the aircraft he was on was attacked on its way back to base on the night of August 13–14. Wing Commander and New Zealander, Trevor Owen Freeman wrote he “immediately returned the fire and succeeded in beating off the first three attacks, but on the fourth attack an unlucky bullet from the enemy fatally injured him. Although your son was a comparatively new member of the squadron he was already very popular, and we will miss him greatly. He died gloriously in the service of the empire, maintaining to the end the highest traditions of the Royal Air Force”.

Robert Arthur Spinley
On August 29 Mr. Robert Arthur Spinley died suddenly at the age of 53. He was the secretary of Auckland Rugby League from 1914 to 1917, and auditor from 1920 to 1941 and was closely involved with the formation of Carlaw Park. He was also involved with the North Shore Rowing Club and North Shore Golf Club. He was a prominent accountant and was the former president of the New Zealand Accountants and Auditors’ Association. He was survived by his wife.

William Robert Dil
On September 21 William Robert Dil of Birkenhead, Auckland was killed in action. He was a sergeant in the Royal New Zealand Air Force and part of the 101 Squadron. Dil had trained at Levin, Harewood, and Woodbourne before leaving to Canada in April 1940. He died from injuries which he received in air operations over England. Dil was born in New Plymouth and educated at Birkenhead Primary School and Northcote High School, before later studying at Auckland Teachers’ Training College, and Auckland University College. He had been posted to the staff of Birkenhead School at the time he enlisted. Dil was a player for the Northcote and Birkenhead Ramblers rugby league club as well as being a “prominent table tennis player”, and a member of the Piha Surf Club. He was aged 22 and was buried at the Cambridge City Cemetery in England.

Hugh McLennan Macdonald
Ponsonby United reserve grade player Hugh McLennan MacDonald was reported missing during air operations on September 28 and it was later confirmed that he had died on September 29 in the Netherlands. He had been born in Fairlie, South Canterbury in 1918 and was educated at Curran Street School and later the Seddon Memorial Technical College in Auckland. He was a Sergeant (Wireless Operator/Air Gunner) in the Royal New Zealand Air Force, 99 Squadron. He had embarked on the Aorangi vessel and trained in Canada at the RCAF, 1 Wireless School in Montreal, Quebec, and then the RCAF, 2 Wireless School in Calgary, Alberta. He then moved to England in May 1940. His twin brother Ian was also serving in the air force at Ohakea as was another brother Allan at Hobsonville. He was buried at Texel (Den Burg) Cemetery, Plot K. Row 4. Grave 89. He is memorialised at All Saints Church in Ponsonby.

Gordon Bert Osborne
Gordon Bert Osborne was killed in action in Tobruk, Western Desert, North Africa on December 1. He was a Private in the army and part of the 18 Infantry Battalion. He had been educated at Northcote Primary School and played for Northcote and Birkenhead Tigers as a junior and then Ellerslie United later on after living in Onehunga at the time of his enlistment. His name is on a memorial at the Onehunga War Memorial Swimming Pool. He was married to Alys O. Osborne of Birkenhead, and 22 years of age when he died, and was buried at the Knightsbridge War Cemetery, Acroma, Libya. His father was Labour Party M.P. Arthur George Osborne, who was the M.P for the Manukau electorate.

Charles John Brockliss
On December 24 Charles John Brockliss passed away at the age of 58. He played for Newton Rangers from 1908 to 1914 as a foundation member. He went on to be a member of the first executive of the Auckland Rugby League from 1915 to 1923 and a vice-president for many years. He played for Auckland in 1910 in a match against Nelson and for Auckland again in 1913 in an exhibition match at Pukekohe against the champion North Shore Albions side.

Senior first grade competitions

Preliminary rounds

Preliminary round 1
  Alan Sayers, the former New Zealand 440 yard champion in 1937, and 1938 British Empire Games representative was on debut for Richmond Rovers. He had previously been playing rugby for Waikato, though he was originally from Auckland where he had been educated at Royal Oak Primary School and Auckland Grammar School. He had scored a record 53 tries for Hamilton Old Boys in the Stag Trophy but had broken his collarbone in a match in 1939 and not played again until this season with Richmond Rovers. This was to be his only season playing rugby league as he enlisted in the army and was seconded to the Royal New Zealand Navy where he served as an intelligence officer in the South Pacific. He died in 2017 aged 101 and is survived by his son, councillor Greg Sayers. During the matches Patrick O’Hanlon (aged 18) was concussed and taken to Auckland Public Hospital. It was said that his condition was not serious.

Preliminary round 2
Following these matches some players departed for the war such as Malcolm Cato, the Mount Albert standoff. He was killed in an air accident on July 16, 1942. Joe Gunning was called up for military service at home but he expected to be available for club matches.

Fox Memorial standings
{|
|-
|

Fox Memorial results

Round 1
In City Rovers match with Newton Rangers they passed 5,000 points scored in the first grade competition and were the first team to do so.

Round 2
No games were going to be played at Carlaw Park on May 10 due to a military parade being held there on Saturday. However, after receiving more information from the military authorities it was found that the parade would be finished in time for one match to be played at 3pm. Therefore, the Richmond v Marist match went ahead at the later start time of 3:30pm. Unofficial shorter matches were also played between Newton and City at 2pm, and Ponsonby and North Shore at 2:45. Newton won their match 19 to 15, while the Ponsonby-North Shore score was not reported if it indeed took place at all. In the City match Lindsay Symons played for City after returning from Wellington where he had spent some seasons. He had previously been a North Shore player. Schultz, who had also played in Auckland for Mount Albert before moving to England to play for York had now returned and played for Newton. He broke his collarbone and was out for the season. Manukau played Papakura in a friendly at Prince Edward Park in Papakura and won 35 to 20. Jack Hemi played his first game of the season for Manukau.

Round 2 continued

Round 3
Graham in the Richmond side played his last game before going into camp. Newton, who had the bye were supposed to play Huntly during the weekend but the match fell through.

Round 4
Future All Black Johnny Simpson scored his debut try for Marist seniors in their 23-23 draw with Newton.

Round 5
Despite heavy rain during the week the Carlaw Park fields were still in good conditions. Alan Sayers scored a remarkable 7 tries for Richmond in their match against Papakura which was a senior club record. Joe Cootes played for Manukau after moving up from Wellington but was said to be returning to Wellington that week.

Round 6
 At this point of the season it was proposed to relegate senior B teams to the reserve grade and attach them to affiliated senior clubs. However the Junior Control Board strongly objected. It was decided to try and play senior B games earlier so that players could then play for senior sides in the 3pm matches if they were short.

Round 7
In the match between North Shore and Papakura played at the Ellerslie Domain, C Peterson of North Shore scored 5 tries while playing in the forwards. It was suggested in the New Zealand herald match report that this may have been a record for a forward in senior matches. It was mentioned in the same newspaper that Jim Murray, who had joined Manukau at the start of the season had been a Hawke's Bay rugby player prior to coming to Auckland. In the Manukau v Newton match, Barnard was on debut for Newton. He had previously been a South Island representative. Watkins was also now playing with Newton after previously having played for Richmond and Mount Albert. During Ponsonby's 8–8 draw with City they brought up their 5,000 point in the senior grade competition becoming the second team to do this after City had done it earlier in the season.

Round 8
James Harold Rae Brassey was on debut for City and scored a try. He had played in the preliminary games at the start of the season. He was a very good athlete, particularly running. He had also been part of the Auckland Grammar 1st XV before leaving school 2 years prior.

Round 9
Joe Cootes had returned again from Wellington and was back playing for Manukau. W Shilton was forced to play halfback for Manukau with the unavailability of Osborne. Verdun Scott was unavailable for North Shore as he had gone into camp at Trentham. Arthur McInnarney was also away at camp as well and unable to play. D McLeod was sent off for Marist in their match with Papakura. He failed to attend the disciplinary meeting mid week and was stood down until he attended to explain the referees charge.  Taripo was on debut for Marist in the same match and it was said that he was “a recent arrival from the islands”. Up to this point few if any players from the Pacific Islands had played in Auckland though Dave Solomon who had been at Richmond for 2 seasons had been born in Fiji.

Round 10

Round 11
G Kelly was refereeing his 50th match involving first grade sides in the clash between Richmond and Marist. He had begun his first grade coaching career in 1937.

Round 12
Jack Hemi scored 24 points for Manukau which included nine successful kicks at goal (7 conversions and 2 penalties). Jack Smith had been in camp at Trentham and played rugby for the Army team the weekend prior. He returned to North Shore and kicked a penalty in their 8–8 draw with Ponsonby. While playing for Marist, William John Bates was concussed and taken to Auckland Hospital.

Round 13
Jack Hemi scored his 100th point in senior games for the season in their win over City. There was controversy during the week with O Chalmers appointed the referee for the Manukau v City match but Manukau officials requested a different referee and J. O’Shannessey refereed instead. Discussion over the matter was taken in committee at the control board meeting the following week and Manukau were summoned to appear. They then expressed regret over their actions and it was decided to take no further action. Former New Zealand representative Dick Smith came out of retirement to fill the fullback position which was usually occupied by his brother Jack Smith. Jack was away for military training.

Round 14
 Papakura recorded their first and last win of the season when they defeated City 5–2. A novel event happened during the weekend when Manukau, who were on their bye, played at Te Kohanga in a game of rugby union. They played under the name of 'Tamaki Rugby' team. The match was to assist (Princess) Te Puea Hērangi in raising funds for the New Zealand Māori Red Cross Society with a dance being held in the Te Kohanga Hall in the evening with music supplied by the T.P.M. orchestra from Ngaruawahia. ‘Manukau’ won by 37 points to 6 and the day also raised £56. Former Manukau player and New Zealand representative Jack Brodrick made his first appearance for the season.

Round 15

Round 16
Verdun Scott of North Shore had gone back to camp and J Greenwood replaced him at centre. City Rovers signed Takapuna rugby wing three quarter H. Rogan. L. Naughton, a North Shore rugby played joined North Shore Albions and played centre.

Round 17
The Auckland representative team was playing South Auckland in Huntly at the same time as the Carlaw Park matches were on. It had been arranged that 3 teams would have a bye to allow for enough talent to be in the Auckland team. They were Mount Albert, Richmond, and Marist. There was supposed to be a match between City and Ponsonby played at Carlaw Park 2, however it appears that these teams decided not to play the match as they were both out of championship contention. During the week the Auckland Star published a piece on Claude List who was remarkably now in his 29th season of rugby league. He had debuted at the senior level for the Kingsland Rovers in 1921. He remained with them for many years and was selected to play for Auckland and New Zealand despite the fact that they were a senior B side. He was the first player ever to do this. After Kingsland amalgamated with Grafton and then essentially folded he joined Marist, and then Mount Albert who he was currently playing with.

Round 18
After round 18 had been completed North Shore Albions had secured the title ahead of Manukau after their 19–9 win over Newton. Manukau won the Thistle Cup by scoring 360 points to North Shore's 304. J Donald came out of retirement to help the City team after not having played for a few seasons.

Roope Rooster
It was decided to include 10 teams in the Roope Rooster competition which would be the 9 teams from the Fox Memorial competition and Otahuhu Rovers who had won the senior B competition. The first round included the 3 lowest placed teams from the Fox Memorial championship and Otahuhu.

Round 1
The 2 matches were played as curtain raisers to the Auckland Māori v Auckland Pākehā match.

Round 2
Marist upset Richmond in their match 11–10 with John Anderson scoring all of their points through a try, conversion, 2 penalties and a “sensational” drop goal which won the match.

Semifinals

Final
Manukau won the Roope Rooster competition with a comfortable win over Ponsonby. It was reported after the game that Jack Hemi had broken the goal kicking record in senior rugby league with 160 points from kicks. He broke the previous record of Bill Davidson who scored 136 points in 1921. However Davidson's total included all club matches and Auckland representative matches.

Phelan Shield

Round 1
The first match in the Phelan Shield was played between Mount Albert and Papakura who had both been eliminated in the first round of the Roope Rooster. It was played at Fowld's Park in Morningside, the home ground of Mount Albert. The score was reported but no scoring details were provided.

Round 2

Semifinals
George Tittleton, the brother of Wally Tittleton had returned to play for Richmond and kicked a penalty in their 13–7 win over City. Ross Jones made his first appearance for North Shore since he returned from the aborted New Zealand tour of England in 1939. He had returned to his farm at Matakana and not played since. City had serious difficulty fielding a team for their match with Richmond.

Final

Stormont Shield

Final

Top try scorers and point scorers
Jim Murray of Manukau scored a remarkable 31 tries which was a record for a season. His teammate Jack Hemi also broke the record for the most points in a season, finishing with 208 which was well ahead of the previous record set by Bill Davidson in 1921.

Senior B grade/Reserve grade competition
With senior teams depleted by the large numbers of players going away to war the Auckland Rugby League decided to merge the reserve grade and senior B grade. The competition was generally reported as “senior B” but was named “reserve grade” at times as well. The fixtures were not listed apart from the first 2 weeks so few venues or referees are known and very few results were reported either. In early June it was reported at the board of control meeting that “several senior B teams had defaulted” and “it was decided to refer the matter to the junior control board for a report”.

Standings
{|
|-
|

Results

Other club matches and lower grades

Lower grade clubs
Otahuhu Rovers won the 3rd grade for the 3rd consecutive time. City Rovers won the 4th grade for the 4th consecutive year. They also beat Richmond Rovers 7–6 in the 4th grade knockout final. Point Chevalier won the 5th grade for the first time in their history. Ellerslie beat Richmond in the 5th grade knockout final by default. Richmond were unbeaten in winning the 6th grade while Ellerslie won the 7th grade. In the senior Schoolboys knockout final Point Chevalier beat R.V. 3–0.

R. Martin of the Otahuhu 3rd grade side won the J.F.W. Dickson medal for the most sportsmanlike player.

Grades were made of the following teams with the winning team in bold:
Third Grade: City Rovers, Glenora, Green Lane, North Shore Albions, Otahuhu Rovers, Papakura, Point Chevalier, Ponsonby United, Richmond Rovers
Fourth Grade Gillett Cup: Avondale, City Rovers, Ellerslie United, Mount Albert United, North Shore Albions, Northcote & Birkenhead Ramblers, Otahuhu Rovers, Point Chevalier, Ponsonby United, Richmond Rovers
Fifth Grade: Ellerslie United, Papakura, Point Chevalier A, Point Chevalier B, Richmond
Sixth Grade: Ellerslie United, Green Lane, Newton Rangers, North Shore Albions, Northcote & Birkenhead Ramblers, Otahuhu Rovers, Ponsonby United, Richmond Rovers
Seventh Grade: Ellerslie United, Green Lane, Ponsonby United, Richmond Rovers

Schoolboys
Senior (Lou Rout trophy): Avondale, Ellerslie United, Mount Albert United, Newmarket, Newton Rangers, Northcote & Birkenhead Ramblers, Point Chevalier, R.V., Ponsonby United, Richmond Rovers
Intermediate (Newport and Eccles Memorial Shield): Avondale, Ellerslie United, Green Lane, Mount Albert United, Newmarket, Newton Rangers, Point Chevalier, Ponsonby United, R.V., Richmond Rovers
Junior: Glenora, Green Lane, Manukau, Marist Old Boys A, Marist Old Boys B, Mount Albert United, Newmarket, North Shore, Northcote & Birkenhead Ramblers, Point Chevalier, Ponsonby United, R.V., Richmond

In October a representative Auckland Schoolboys side was selected to play for the Golden Bloom Banner in a match against South Auckland Schoolboys. The team was: (BACKS) J. Takiru (R.V.), M. Daly (Avondale), J. Mackie (Mount Albert), L. Jury (Point Chevalier), J. Stackpole (Newton), D. White (Ponsonby), C. Moyle (Newton), C. Laurent (Mount Albert), (FORWARDS) W. Forman (Point Chevalier), P. Martin (R.V.), C. Aulderton (Newton), D. Rodgers (Mount Albert), C. Poole (Point Chevalier), J. Allen (Avondale), and H. Moore (Northcote). They played a return match at Carlaw Park a week later with Auckland winning 17–0.

On November 8 a Schoolboy Gala Day was held at Carlaw Park. Events included 50 yard races, relay races, Tug O War, and a seven-a-side tournament with Mount Albert beating Green Lane.

Other matches

Auckland Referees v South Auckland Referees 
The match was for the Walmesley Shield

Papakura v City

Stratford v Newton

Miramar (Wellington) v Richmond

Representative fixtures
In August the West Coast board requested Auckland send a touring side there to play a match and possibly others in the South Island. However Auckland declined as “owing to war conditions and the fact of many prominent players being unable to obtain leave”. Chairman Campbell said “tentative arrangements had already been made, but it was found that at least six players hold important positions in various war industries, and unless the best combination was available, the trip was not advisable”.

Auckland Māori v South Auckland (Waikato)
The first representative match of the season was played on the Kings Birthday holiday. A curtain raiser was played between the Papakura Camp army side against Ellerslie's senior B team.

Auckland v South Auckland (Waikato)
 Originally Brian Riley and Pita Ririnui were named to play in the Auckland side but were dropped after being unable to train. Chairman G. Grey Campbell said “chosen players must practise”. Ririnui had said he was unable to attend the two trainings while Riley had injured an ankle on the previous Saturday. Acting Prime Minister, the Honorable Walter Nash, and Honorable Patrick Charkes Webb (Minister of Labour) were among the spectators which numbered between 9 and 10 thousand. Auckland trialled 14-6 before a big comeback saw them win 25–14. In a curtain-raiser the South Auckland Schoolboys beat Auckland Schoolboys 9–8.

South Auckland Old Boys v All Golds
On Sunday, August 10 an All Golds team of veteran representative players traveled to Davies Park in Huntly to take on a South Auckland veteran side. The cause was to raise money for "local patriotic funds" and the days events were organised by the Huntly Patriotic Committee. Nine Auckland bands also made the trip with 3,000 spectators in attendance and 
£200 was raised. The All Golds team included Craddock Dufty, Roy Hardgrave, Allan Seagar, Clarrie McNeil, Stan Prentice, C Dunn, Roy Powell, Stan Clark, Jack Satherley, Des Herring, Jack McLeod, W. McLaughlin, Trevor Hanlon, with the reserves: Norm Campbell, Tim Peckham, Len Schultz, J Purdy, Gordon Campbell, and H Flanagan.

South Auckland (Waikato) v Auckland
Jim Clark and E Chapman were appointed managers for the Auckland team on their trip south to Davies Park in Huntly. Auckland Schoolboys travelled with them and defeated South Auckland Schoolboys 17–3. Auckland were welcomed to the ground by the mayor of Huntly, Mr. George Smith with a large attendance present. There was no rain during the match but it was in heavy condition with large pools of water in places.

Auckland Māori v Auckland Pākehā
Auckland Māori won the match with a last minute try to Gregory after they had trailed 16–17.

Senior B Trial match Senior Clubs v Junior Clubs
On September 13 a trial match was played between the Senior Clubs and Junior Clubs from the senior B grade. The Senior clubs were made up of Manukau, Ponsonby, Mount Albert, Richmond and North Shore, while the Junior Clubs were made up of Point Chevalier, Otahuhu, Ellerslie, and Northcote.

NZ OB's v S. Auckland OB's (Les Lees Challenge Cup)
On September 27 a match was played between the recently formed New Zealand Old Boys Association and the South Auckland Old Boys. The New Zealand side was essentially made up of Auckland players. The Minister of Labour, Paddy Webb kicked off the match. The afternoon also including marching bands and a tribute to soldiers who served in the first World War, along with a wrestling match between M. Donovan, and A. Edwards.

Auckland Representative Matches Played and Scorers

Auckland Māori Representative Matches Played and Scorers

Auckland Pākehā Representative Matches Played and Scorers

Annual General Meetings and Club News

Auckland Rugby League Junior Control Board
They held their annual meeting on March 25 at the League Rooms on Courthouse Lane. At the annual meeting of the Junior Control Board on April 8 the following board was elected:- Messrs. E. Chapman (chairman), C. Howe (vice-chairman), W. Clarke (secretary), I. Stonex (assistant secretary and grounds allocator), G. Batchelor, W. Burgess, T. Carey, M. McNamara, E. Kane, E. Renner. Nominations for all grades would close on April 22 with May 3 set as a possible season start date.

ARL Schoolboy Management Committee
In May it was reported that 39 teams had been nominated in the schoolboys competition.

Auckland Rugby League Referees Association
They held their annual meeting on March 10 at the ARL Board Rooms in Greys Buildings. They elected the following officers”- President, Mr, Les Bull; vice-president, Mr. G. McGowatt; delegate to the ARL, Mr. William Mincham; delegate to the junior control board, Mr. J. Short; delegate to the senior management committee, Mr. J. Kelly; delegate to the New Zealand Referees’ Association, Mr. Les Bull; secretary, Mr. Thomas E. Skinner; treasurer, Mr. A. E. Chapman; auditor, Mr. Percy Rogers; official critic, Mr. S. Billman; examination committee Messrs. Renton and Brady; appointment board, Mr. Percy Rogers; executive, Messrs. Maurice Wetherill, R. Otto, and Hawkes. At their meeting on June 3 they farewelled Seargant N. D. McIvor who was going to war. With 50 members present best wishes and a safe return were wished and Mr. G. McCowatt presented him with an inscribed notecase.

Avondale Rugby League Football Club
Avondale held their annual meeting in St. Jude's Street Hall on Tuesday, April 1. Their honorary secretary was H. W. Green. They advertised for a general practice in the newspaper to be held at the Avondale Racecourse on Saturday, April 5 with all players to report to club captain, Mr. E. Buck at 2pm. Then on April 18 they advertised for players in all grades from schoolboys to senior B.

City Rovers Football Club
City Rovers held their annual meeting at the League Rooms in the Grey Buildings on Courthouse Lane on Thursday, the 20th of March. Ernie Asher was their secretary for the season. At the control board meeting on April 23 Mr. J. Rutledge said that the City club would have Roy Hardgrave as their player coach.

Ellerslie United League Football Club
On March 12 Ellerslie United held their annual meeting at the Parish Hall in Ellerslie. They held a training for “all grades” on the Ellerslie Reserve on Friday, April 11 at 2 pm. Their honorary secretary for 1941 was Mr. G. Whaley. Ellerslie applied for life memberships in Auckland Rugby League in April on behalf of Messrs. G. Chapman, and J. McInnarney but this was deferred by the Auckland Rugby League and a subcommittee of chairman Campbell, Ivan Culpan, Ted Phelan, and W. O. Carlaw was appointed to offer suggestions governing the classification of life-members. In May “the Ellerslie branch of the Fighting Forces Patriotic fund appealed for a senior fixture to be arranged at Ellerslie on a date in the near future”. The request was deferred so that a suitable match could be arranged. The round 7 match on June 21 was played at the Ellerslie Domain and the Ellerslie patriotic committee wrote a letter expressing thanks in July.

Glenora Rugby League Football Club

Green Lane Football Club
Green Lane held their annual meeting at the Training Shed in Green Lane on Wednesday, March 26. At the June 25 ARL meeting a letter from the Green Lane club was read asking about trophies which would be allotted for the season. Several suggestions were made but the matter was deferred until later in the season.

Manukau Rugby League Football Club
They held their annual meeting on March 11 in the Labour Party Rooms, in the Strand Theatre Buildings on Queen Street in Onehunga. They began their preseason training at the Training Shed on Galway Street on Saturday, March 29. On July 15 at the ARL meeting Manukau requested that their match with Marist scheduled for August 2 be played at Waikaraka Park in Onehunga for the benefit of the Onehunga Patriotic Fund. The board decided to defer the decision for a week. News came on July 24 from Mihaka Panapa, the former Manukau player who was serving in the war. He said “the restaurants were our camping grounds, and really we did make gluttons of ourselves”. “It was eat, eat all the time, and still more eating” as they were on leave from Crete for seven days in Egypt. Panapa was killed on December 16 in the same year in the Western Desert, North Africa and was buried at Knightsbridge War Cemetery, Acroma, Libya.

Marist Brothers Old Boys League Football Club
On March 6 The Marist club in conjunction with the Parnell branch of the Returned Soldier's Association held a gathering at the Parnell Returned Soldiers Hall to farewell J. Matthews who had played three quarter for the senior side for several seasons. He was a member of the expeditionary force. They presented him with a razor case. They held their annual meeting in the rugby league rooms on Courthouse Lane on March 13.

Mount Albert League Football Club
Their annual meeting was held at King George's Hall at the Mount Albert Terminus on March 17. They held their first official training for all grades at Fowlds Park, Morningside on Saturday, April 5. Their honorary secretary was H. G. Shaw. On June 28 it was reported that 4 brothers, who had all represented Mount Albert were serving in the war. They were Private Theodore Roberts, Private Albert Roberts, Gunner Kenneth Roberts, and Gunner Reginald Roberts. Reginald was killed in action on July 5, 1942 in North Africa.

Newmarket Rugby League Football Club
They held their annual meeting in the Municipal Buildings in Newmarket on Wednesday, April 9. Their honorary secretary was Mr. B. R. Arnott.

Newton Rangers League Football Club
Newton held their annual meeting on March 17 in the League Rooms. They began their preseason training for seniors and juniors on Tuesday, April 1 at Carlaw Park at 7pm. Their honorary secretary was Mr. J. A. MacKinnon. At the July 9 meeting of the ARL Newton were granted permission to travel to Taranaki on August 2 to play an exhibition match at Stratford. Mr. J. A. McKinnon was appointed manager for the trip.

North Shore Albions League Football Club
North Shore Albions held their annual meeting in Buffaloes’ Hall on Wednesday, March 26.
 They advertised for their first training on Wednesday, April 9 at 7:30 pm at the Football Shed with juniors and schoolboys practising the following Saturday on the Football Ground at 2pm. Their secretary for the season was Mr. Merven William Coghlan.

Northcote and Birkenhead Ramblers Football Club

Otahuhu Rugby League Football Club
On March 11 Otahuhu held their annual meeting at the League Rooms on Hutton Street, Otahuhu.

Papakura Rugby League Football Club
Held their annual meeting in early March. Their president Mr. L. McVeagh explained that it was very difficult to secure senior players for the coming season as “no fewer than thirty members were now serving overseas and a dozen were waiting to be called up”. McVeagh said “in the senior team only five could be accounted for, the rest were serving overseas. All the third grade had now joined up and no fewer than 35 members were in army service”. The possibility of “grouping clubs” was discussed. Mr. J. Miller passed a motion that a special meeting be called with a “suggestion that a senior team be formed from the Papakura, Otahuhu and Ellerslie clubs”. While another speaker stated that “other amalgamation proposal were: City and Newton, and Ponsonby and Mt. Albert, and that Papakura would have to be prepared to do likewise”. The financial statement showed that £150 had been spent on transport, though £300 had been received in donations and they finished the year with £115 as a credit balance. The following officers were elected:- President, Mr. L. McVeagh; 20 vice-presidents, treasurer, Mr. B. Turner; committee Messrs. A. Hill, W. Tyson, F. Osborne, W. Leighton, E.J. Clarke, R. Bates, A. Burgess, F. Smith, and F. Wells.

At a meeting of the Papakura Council on March 24 permission for the use of Prince Edward Park was granted for the league club at a rental of £10, plus the cost of lighting. The mayor said that the lighting might be used for training in the future if it were sufficiently shrouded which would have been due to the war and the effort to not use lighting unnecessarily at night. It was reported on May 1 that the Papakura club had taken exception to the grazing of sheep on Prince Edward Park on their playing area. The Papakura Borough Council decided to cut the grass on the playing area but refused to withdraw the sheep from the park. The club was also advised that the Auckland Rugby League strictly prohibited lighting for practice at the park in May. In June it was reported that A. Verner had been wounded in the war. He had been a playing member of the Papakura club and his father Fred served on the committee. At the July 9 meeting of the ARL they requested permission for a senior match to be played at Prince Edward Park later in the season. The league decided to defer their decision until the next meeting. They again requested a match on July 15 for later in the season but the decision was deferred further. On July 19 a lengthy article was written in the Auckland Star about the poor showing from the Papakura senior team which had struggled in the past 2 seasons.

Pt Chevalier Rugby League Football Club
Pt. Chevalier advertised a practice for all grades to be held on Saturday, April 19 at 2pm on Walker Park in Point Chevalier. The schoolboys were to practice at 10:30 a.m.

Ponsonby United Football Club
Held their annual meeting on February 24 in their club rooms on Jervois Road, Ponsonby. They began their pre-season training on Saturday, March 22 at Carlaw Park. Their honorary secretary for 1941 was Mr. W. J. Grieve. Their senior coach for the season was Dougie McGregor.

Richmond Rovers Football Club
Richmond Rovers held their annual meeting on March 5 at their clubrooms in Grey Lynn Park. Their first preseason training session was at Grey Lynn Park on Saturday, April 5. Junior players were expected to report to Mr. J. Wilson, Club Captain at 2pm and senior players at 3pm. In September Richmond were granted permission to travel to Wellington to play a match against Miramar who were the Wellington champions at the Basin Reserve. Messrs. J. McGregor, W. Rodwell, and W. R. Dick were approved at officials to go with the team.

Transfers and registrations
Robert Grotte had his transfer cleared from Marist to City in late April.

On May 21 the following transfers were approved: R Oliver from Newton to Manukau, R Cheater from North Shore to Newton, J.S. Boyd and W.L. Dormer from Ponsonby to Point Chevalier.

On June 4 M. Soloman was reinstated. C Brimble was granted a transfer from the Central club in Wellington to Newton, while L. Shaw was transferred from North Shore to Manukau. On June 18 M. Barnard of Christchurch was transferred to Newton Rangers, and C. Webb from Stratford to City Rovers. On June 25 the transfers were approved of G. Moyes and C. Deverall from Manukau to Huntly, while R. Lumley was reinstated. On July 15 Roy Hardgrave had his transfer from Mount Albert to Newton approved, as did L. Rowntree who was moving from City to Newton. On July 23 Edwin Abbott was granted a transfer from Richmond to Ellerslie and regraded to senior B. He had represented New Zealand from 1930 to 1932 but had not played in Auckland for many seasons after originally playing in the Waikato. The following players were registered:- W. Major, M Thompson, J. Gregory (Manukau); W. N. C. Craig (Richmond), M. Smythe (Mount Albert); E. G. Wood (Marist); J. H. Corbett (City). Also G. O. Leahy transferred from the St. George club in Wellington to Northcote. On August 27 “the question of the membership with the Newton club of W. R. Brimble, who had already played this season with Manukau was discussed at length, and it was decided that as Brimble was not a registered member of the Manukau club, he must stand down for a period of 12 months, dating from his last game with Newton”.

On September 3 L. A. Naughton was officially registered with North Shore, and G. H. Hewson with Papakura.

References

External links
 Auckland Rugby League Official Site

Auckland Rugby League seasons